Sheila Hicks (born 1934) is an American artist. She is known for her innovative and experimental weavings and sculptural textile art that incorporate distinctive colors, natural materials, and personal narratives.

Since 1964, she has lived and worked in Paris, France. Prior to that, she lived and worked in Guerrero, Mexico from 1959 to 1963.

Early life and education
Sheila Hicks was born in Hastings, Nebraska in 1934.
She attended the Yale School of Art in Connecticut from 1954 to 1959, where she studied with Josef Albers, Rico Lebrun, Bernard Chaet, George Kubler, George Heard Hamilton, Vincent Scully, Jose de Riviera, Herbert Matter, Norman Ives, and Gabor Peterdi. Her thesis on pre-Incaic textiles was supervised by archaeologist Junius Bird of the American Museum of Natural History in New York. She received her BFA in 1957 .

Born during the Great Depression in Hastings, Nebraska, Sheila Hicks spent much of her early life on the road, with her father seeking work where he found it. This “fantastic…migratory existence,” 1 as she has described it, has come to define her six-decade career as an artist. Extensive experiences traveling, living, and working around the world continue to advance her exploration of textiles, the pliable and adaptable medium with which she is most closely associated. “Textile is a universal language. In all of the cultures of the world, textile is a crucial and essential component,” Hicks has said. 2 Captivated by structure, form, and color, she has looked to weaving cultures across the globe to shape her work at varying scales, from small hand-woven works called Minimes and wall hangings; to sculptural fiber piles like The Evolving Tapestry: He/She (1967–68); to monumental corporate commissions, among them Enchantillon: Medallion (1967), a prototype for an installation at New York’s Ford Foundation. More recently, Pillar of Inquiry/Supple Column (2014) demonstrates Hicks’s intense fascination with experimental materials: a whirling structure of multicolored synthetic fibers cascades from the ceiling, as if breaking through from the sky above.

Career 

From 1959 to 1964 she resided and worked in Mexico; She moved to Taxco el Viejo, Mexico where she began weaving, painting, and teaching at the National Autonomous University of Mexico (UNAM) at the invitation of Mathias Goeritz who also introduced to the architects Luis Barragán and Ricardo Legorreta Vilchis. Since 1964, Hicks lives and works in Paris, France.

She photographed extensively with her Rolleiflex. Her subjects included the architecture of Felix Candela and artists active in Mexico.

In 2007, the publication Sheila Hicks: Weaving as Metaphor, designed by Irma Boom to accompany the exhibition of the same name at Bard Graduate Center, was named "Most Beautiful Book in the World" at the Leipzig Book Fair.

In 2010 a retrospective of Hicks' 50-year career originated at the Addison Gallery in Andover, Mass. with additional venues at the ICA in Philadelphia, and at The Mint Museum in Charlotte, North Carolina. This included both miniature works (her "minimes") and large scale sculpture.

In 2013, the 18-foot-high Pillar of Inquiry/Supple Column was included in the Whitney Biennal.

In 2017 Hicks had a solo exhibition at Alison Jacques Gallery in Paris. Hicks also participated in the 2017 Venice Biennale, Viva Arte Viva, May 13 – November 26, 2017.

In 2018, February 7 – April 30, Hicks had a solo exhibition Life Lines at the Centre Pompidou which included more than 100 works.

On April 21, 2022, Hicks had an interview with T: The New York Times Style Magazine, the title of the interview was "Artist Sheila Hicks: Observing Her Surroundings in the Courtyard". She said the following about the way she works: "I move from idea to finished work acrobatically — it's as though I can feel the clouds shifting and the light coming and going. But because I frequently use fiber and textiles, I'm also quite specific in the way I work;unlike a video artist or a digital artist, I'm physically engaged in the creation of all my work. It's a manualpractice but filtered through the optics of architecture, photography, form, material and color. A couple of years ago, I received an honorary doctorate from my school — I went to Yale in the '50s — and it made me very happy because it validated my choice to work and live as an artist. It meant that I could contribute something to theother fields, and so I'm seeking out what that might be, unlike many artists, who are seeking simply to express themselves."

"She likes to work simultaneously on many things. For instance, today she was asked to create an environmental work at King's Cross, near the London train station, for the summer months. She is also making something for a municipal complex by the port in Oslo to coincide with the opening of that city's Museum of Modern Art. Tomorrow, she will presenting models for tapestries to the Gobelins Manufactory. And then she has an exhibition up now at the Hepworth Wakefield in Yorkshire, England. she does whatever she thinks is interesting."

Personal life
In 1964, Hicks moved to Paris, France, with her daughter where she has lived ever since. In 1965, she married fellow artist Enrique Zañartu with whom she had a son.

Work 

Hicks' art ranges from the minuscule to the monumental. Her materials vary as much as the size and shape of her work. Having begun her career as a painter, she has remained close to color, using it as a language she builds, weaves and wraps to create her pieces.

She incorporates various materials into her "minimes", miniature weavings made on a wooden loom. These include transparent noodles, pieces of slate, razor clam shells, shirt collars, collected sample skeins of embroidery threads, rubber bands, shoelaces, and Carmelite-darned socks. Her temporary installations have incorporated thousands of hospital "girdles" – birth bands for newborns – baby shirts, blue nurses' blouses and khaki army shirts, as well as the wool sheets darned by Carmelite nuns.

Hicks's work is characterised by her direct examination of indigenous weaving practices in the countries of their origin. This has led her travel through five continents, studying the local culture in Mexico, France, Morocco, India, Chile, Sweden, Israel, Saudi Arabia, Japan and South Africa, developing relationships with designers, artisans, industrialists, architects, politicians and cultural leaders.

Solo exhibitions

 1958: "Tejidos", National Museum of Natural History, Santiago, Chile
 1958: "pinturas de s.a.w. hicks—fotografias de sergio larrain", Museo de Bellas Artes, Santiago, Chile
 1961: "Tejidos—Sheila Hicks", Galeria Antonio Souza, Mexico, D.F.
 1963: "The Textiles of Sheila Hicks", Art Institute of Chicago, Illinois
 1963-66: "Sheila Hicks", Knoll International, Nuremberg, Düsseldorf, Hamburg, Cologne, Berlin, Frankfurt, Stuttgart, Germany; Basel, Switzerland
 1965: "Woven Forms and Sculpture: Sheila Hicks", Interiors International (Knoll), London, England
 1965: "Gewebte Formen", Landesmuseum, Oldenburg, Germany
 1970: "Fete du Fil", Institut Franco-Americain de Rennes, France; Forme in Faden, Buchholz Gallery, Munich, Germany; American Library, Brussels, Belgium
 1971: "Formes de Fil", Musée des Beaux-Arts, Brest, France
 1972: Fils Dansants, Tapis aux Murs de Sheila Hicks, American Cultural Center, Dakar, Senegal; Abidjan, Côte d'Ivoire; American Center, Milan, Italy
 1974: "Sheila Hicks", Stedelijk Museum, Amsterdam, The Netherlands
 1976: "Tapisserie Mise en Liberte; Ancient Peruvian Textiles and the Work of Sheila Hicks", Maison de la Culture, Rennes, France
 1977: Muzeja savremene umetnosti, Belgrade; Museum of Art, Skopje, Macedonia; Museum of Contemporary Art, Dubrovnic, Yugoslavia; Biblioteca Americana, Bucharest, Romania
 1978: "Tons and Masses, Sheila Hicks", Lunds Konsthall, Lund, Sweden
 1979: "Suite Ouessantine", Musée de Beaux-Arts, Brest, France
 1979: "Inhabited", American Center, Paris, France
 1980: "Free Fall", Israel Museum, Jerusalem, Israel
 1980: "Small Jump", American Cultural Centre, Tel Aviv, Israel
 1981: "Carte Blanche", Musée des Beaux Arts, Rennes, France
 1987: "Textile, Texture, Texte", Musée de Beaux Arts, Pau, France
 1991: "Soft Logic", Seoul Arts Center, Seoul, Korea; Centre Culturel Francais, Seoul, Korea
 1992: "Cultural Exchange", Walker's Point Center of the Arts, Milwaukee, Wisconsin
 1992: "Sheila Hicks v Prague", Umeleckoprumyslove Muzeum, Prague, Czechoslovakia
 1993: "Small Works", Saka Gallery, Tokyo, Japan
 1994: "Textile Magiker: Sheila Hicks-Junichi Arai", Textile Museet, Boras, Sweden
 1996: "Art of Sheila Hicks", Museum of Nebraska Art, Kearney, Nebraska
 1997: "Sheila Hicks: The Making of a Doncho", Municipal Cultural Center Gallery, Kiryu, Gunma, Japan
 1999: "Sheila Hicks: Seeds to the Wind", Contemporary Art Center of Virginia, Virginia Beach, Virginia
 2006: "Sheila Hicks: Weaving as Metaphor", Bard Graduate Center, New York, NY
 2007: Entrelacs de Sheila Hicks. Textiles et vanneries d'Afrique et d'Océanie de la collection Ghysels, Passage de Retz, Paris France
 2008: "Sheila Hicks Minimes: Small Woven Works", Davis & Langdale Company, Inc. New York
 2010: "Sheila Hicks: 50 Years", Addison Gallery of American Art, Andover, Massachusetts. Institute of Contemporary Art Philadelphia, PA, and Mint Museum, Charlotte, NC
 2010: Sheila Hicks: Hors norms, sculptures textiles, Passage de Retz, Paris
 2011: "Sheila Hicks - One Hundred Minimes", The Museum of Decorative Arts (UPM), Prague
 2011: "Sheila Hicks - 100 Minimes", Boijmans van Beuningen Museum, Rotterdam
 2012: "Sheila Hicks", Sikkema Jenkins & Co., New York
 2013: "Pêcher dans la Rivière", Alison Jacques Gallery, London
 2014: "Sheila Hicks", Sikkema Jenkins & Co., New York
 2014: "Sheila Hicks: Unknown Data", Galerie Frank Elbaz, Paris
 2015: "Sheila Hicks: Foray into Chromatic Zones", Hayward Gallery, London
 2016: "Si j'étais de laine, vous m'accepteriez?" Galerie Frank Elbaz, Paris
 2016: "Sheila Hicks: Material Voices", Joslyn Art Museum Omaha, Nebraska 
 2016: "Sheila Hicks, Hilos libres. El textil y sus raíces prehispánicas, 1954-2017" (Free thread. The textile and its prehispanic roots, 1954-2017), Museo Amparo, Puebla, México
2017: Galleria Massimo Minini, Brescia, Italy
2017: "Stones of Peace", Alison Jacques Gallery, London
2017: "Hop, Skip, Jump, and Fly: Escape From Gravity", High Line, New York City
2018: "Sheila Hicks: Lignes de Vie", Centre Pompidou, Paris, France
2018: Sheila Hicks: Migador, Magasin III Museum & Foundation for Contemporary Art, Jaffa, Israel
2018: Panta Rhei, Sheila Hicks, Judit Reigl, Galerie Nächst St. Stephan, Wein, Austria
2019: Sheila Hicks 'Line by Line, Step by Step' April 29 – June 8, 2019, and June 10 – August 17, 2019 (Next Chapter), Demisch Danant, New York
2019: "Sheila Hicks," May 11, 2019 - August 18, 2019, Nasher Sculpture Center, Dallas, Texas.
2019: Sheila Hicks, Reencuentro [Reencounter], August 9, 2019 – January 31, 2020, Museo Chileno de Arte Precolombino, Santiago, 2019.

Awards and recognition 

 1957–58: Fulbright Program, grant to paint in Chile
 1959–60: Fribourg grant to paint in France
 1975: American Institute of Architects, Medal
 1980: Middlebury College, H.W. Janson Distinguished Visiting Professor of Art
 1983: American Craft Council (New York, NY), Fellow
 1984: Rhode Island School of Design (Providence, RI), Honorary Doctorate
 1985: French Academy of Architecture (Paris, France), Silver Medal of Fine Arts
 1987: Ministry of Culture's Ordre des Arts et des Lettres (Paris, France), Chevalier
 1993: Ministry of Culture's Ordre des Arts et des Lettres (Paris, France), Officier
 1997: American Craft Council, Gold Medal
 2007: Textile Museum (Washington, D.C.), 25 Year Honoree
 2010: Smithsonian Institution's Archives of American Art, Lifetime Achievement Award
 2014: École des Beaux-Arts (Paris, France) Honorary Doctorate
 2019: Yale University, Honorary Doctorate

Museum collections 

Hicks' work can be found in private and public collections, including: Ford Foundation, NY, 1967; Georg Jensen Center for Advanced Design, NY; Air France Boeing 747 planes, 1969–74; TWA terminal at JFK Airport, NY, 1973; CBS (Columbia Broadcasting System), NY;  Rochester Institute of Technology, NY; Banque Rothschild, Paris, France; Francis Bouygues, Paris, France; IBM, Paris, France, 1972; Kodak, Paris, France ; Fiat Tower, Paris, Franc; MGIC Investment Corporation, Milwaukee, WI; King Saud University, Riyadh, Saudi Arabia, 1983; Kellogg's, Michigan; Fuji City, Cultural Center, Japan, 1999; Institute of Advance Study, Princeton, NJ; Target Headquarters, Minneapolis, MN, 2003; SD26 Restaurant, NY, 2009; Ford Foundation (reconstructed), NY, 2013–14; Foundation Louis Vuitton, Boulogne, France, 2014–15.

 Addison Gallery of American Art (Andover, MA)
 Centre Georges Pompidou (Paris, France)
 Cleveland Museum of Art (Cleveland, OH)
 Denver Art Museum (Denver, CO)
 Industriet Museum (Oslo, Norway)
 Institute for Advanced Study (Princeton, NJ)
 Kunsthalle Bielefeld (Germany)
 Kunstmuseum (Oldenburg, Germany)
 Manufacture des Gobelins (Paris, France)
 Milwaukee Art Museum (Milwaukee, WI)
 Minneapolis Institute of Art (Minneapolis, MN)
 Mint Museum (Charlotte, NC)
 Musée de la Mode et du Textile (Paris, France)
 Musée de la Tapisserie (Angers, France)
 Musée des Arts Décoratifs (Paris, France)
 Musée des Beaux Arts (Brest, France)
 Musée des Beaux Arts (Pau, France)
 Museo de Bellas Artes (Santiago, Chile)
 Museo Universitario Arte Contemporáneo (Mexico City, Mexico)
 Museum of Art and Design (New York, NY)
 Museum of Decorative Arts in Prague (Prague, Czech Republic)
 Museum of Design, Zürich (Zurich, Switzerland)
 Museum of Fine Arts, Boston (Boston, MA)
 Museum of Modern Art (New York, NY)
 Museum of Nebraska Art (Kearney, NE)
 National Gallery of Art (Washington, DC)
 National Museum of Modern Art, Kyoto (Kyoto, Japan)
 National Museum of Modern Art, Tokyo (Tokyo, Japan)
 North Dakota Museum of Art (Grand Forks, ND)
 Okawa Museum of Art (Kiryu, Japan)
 Philadelphia Museum of Art (Philadelphia, PA)
 Renwick Gallery (Washington, DC)
 Saint Louis Art Museum (St. Louis, MO)
 Smart Museum of Art (Chicago, IL)
 Smithsonian American Art Museum (Washington, D.C.)
 Smithsonian Cooper-Hewitt National Design Museum (New York, NY)
 Stedelijk Museum (Amsterdam, The Netherlands)
 Tate Museum (London, England)
 The Art Institute of Chicago (Chicago, IL)
 The Metropolitan Museum of Art (New York, NY)
 The National Gallery of Art (Washington, DC)
 Victoria and Albert Museum (London, UK)
 Wadsworth Atheneum (Hartford, CT)
 Yale Art Gallery (New Haven, CT)

See also
 Fiber art
 Tapestry
 Yale School of Art
 Sculpture

References

Further reading

External links

 "Sheila Hicks: 50 Years", wiki entry from the Mint Museum
 Sheila Hicks in the collection of the Museum of Modern Art
 Sheila Hicks interview on Prayer Rug, 1965, MoMA
An interview with Sheila Hicks, conducted 2004 February 3-March 11, by Monique Levi-Strauss, for the Archives of American Art
Sheila Hicks personal website: https://www.sheilahicks.com/bio

1934 births
People from Hastings, Nebraska
Living people
Artists from Nebraska
Yale University alumni
American expatriates in Mexico
American expatriates in France
American women artists
Women textile artists
American weavers
21st-century American women